is a racing arcade video game developed by ADK and originally published by SNK on April 26, 1996. It is the spiritual successor to Thrash Rally, which was released earlier in 1991 on Neo Geo platforms.

Themed around rallying, Over Top pits the players with competing against AI-controlled opponents in races across various locations. Directed by Magician Lord designer Takashi Egashira, the game was created by most of the same team that previously worked on several projects at ADK. Though it was initially launched for the Neo Geo MVS (arcade), the title was later released for both Neo Geo AES (home) and Neo Geo CD respectively, in addition of being re-released through download services for various consoles.

Over Top was received with mixed reception from critics and reviewers since its initial release.

Gameplay 

Over Top is a top-down rally racing game where players observe from above and races across various locations by participating in a single race against AI-controlled opponents. Each location has their own weather conditions that changes how the car is controlled through the track, as well as shortcuts to gain advantage against opponents.

The title uses a checkpoint in which the player gains extra time by reaching a tunnel at the end of each location. Failing to reaching the checkpoint results in a game over screen unless players insert more credits into the arcade machine to continue playing. If a memory card is present, the player is allowed to save their progress and resume the last point the game saved at.

Development and release 
Over Top was created by most of the same team that previously worked on several projects at ADK, with Magician Lord designer Takashi Egashira acting as its director alongside producer Kazuo Arai. Yukinori Nishikata served as chief programmer, while the soundtrack was composed by Keiichiro Segawa and Takao Oshima. Several other people also collaborated in its development.

Over Top was first released by SNK for the Neo Geo MVS on April 26, 1996, and was then released for Neo Geo AES on May 24 of the same year. The Japanese AES release has since become one of the more expensive titles on the platform, with copies of the port fetching over US$4500 on the secondary video game collecting market. The game was later re-released for the Neo Geo CD by ADK on September 26, 1996. The title has received multiple re-releases in recent years on various digital distribution platforms such as the Nintendo eShop, PlayStation Network and Xbox Live.

Reception 

Over Top received mixed reception from critics and reviewers since release. AllGames Kyle Knight commended its graphics, gameplay and replay value but criticized the introductory CGI sequence for being poorly done. MAN!ACs Andreas Knauf compared the game negatively with Neo Drift Out: New Technology, criticizing the Sega Mega Drive-esque visuals and sound design, as well as the simple controls.

Reviewing the Nintendo Switch re-release, Nintendo Lifes Damien McFerran criticized the CGI graphics and introduction but commended the music and simple controls, regarding it to be "a very average racing title which lacks longevity and won't keep you occupied for very long." Pure Nintendo Magazines Trevor Gould and Heath M. Shusterman-Zimmerman gave the Switch re-release a mixed outlook.

Notes

References

External links 
 Over Top at GameFAQs
 Over Top at Killer List of Videogames
 Over Top at MobyGames

1996 video games
ACA Neo Geo games
ADK (company) games
Arcade video games
Neo Geo games
Neo Geo CD games
Nintendo Switch games
Off-road racing video games
PlayStation Network games
PlayStation 4 games
Single-player video games
SNK games
Top-down racing video games
Video games scored by Keiichiro Segawa
Video games scored by Takao Oshima
Video games developed in Japan
Xbox One games
Hamster Corporation games